Karamanlis or Karamanli may refer to:

 someone or something from Karaman, Turkey

People
 The Karamanlis political family of Greece
  (1880-1932), Greek teacher
 Konstantinos Karamanlis (1907–1998), former President and Prime Minister of Greece
 Kostas Karamanlis (born 1956), nephew of Konstantinos, former Prime Minister of Greece
 Anastasia Pazaiti-Karamanli (born 1966), better known as Natasa Pazaïti, wife of Kostas
  (born 1932), son of George and brother of Konstantinos, MP 1974-2009 and government minister
 Kostas Karamanlis (born 1974), son of Achilleas, MP since January 2015
 Anna Karamanli, Greek sportswoman and politician
 Marietta Karamanli (born 1964), French politician
 Karamanli dynasty (Turkish: Karamanlı) of Ottoman Tripolitania
 Ahmed Karamanli (1686–1745), dynasty's founder and pasha of Tripolitania
 Yusuf Karamanli (1766–1838), pasha of Tripolitania

Places
 Karamania (region), a region of Asia Minor in Turkey
 Karamanlı, Burdur, a district of Burdur Province, Turkey
 Qaramanlı, Yevlakh Rayon, Azerbaijan
 Qaramanlı, Neftchala (disambiguation), several places in Azerbaijan

Other uses
 Karamanlides, a Turkish-speaking Eastern Orthodox Christian group
 Karamanli Turkish, a dialect of Turkish historically spoken by the group
 Karamanids, a historical Turkish dynasty in Asia Minor
 Stella Karamanlis, a character in the American miniseries The Pacific

See also
 Karaman (disambiguation)